Friedrich Melchior, Baron von Grimm (26 September 172319 December 1807) was a German-born French-language journalist, art critic, diplomat and contributor to the Encyclopédie ou Dictionnaire raisonné des sciences, des arts et des métiers. In 1765 Grimm wrote Poème lyrique, an influential article for the Encyclopédie on lyric and opera librettos. Like Christoph Willibald Gluck and Ranieri de' Calzabigi, Grimm became interested in opera reform.

Early years 

Grimm was born at Regensburg, the son of Johann Melchior Grimm (1682–1749), a pastor, and Sibylle Margarete Grimm, (née Koch) (1684–1774). He studied at the University of Leipzig, where he came under the influence of Johann Christoph Gottsched and of Johann August Ernesti, to whom he was largely indebted for his critical appreciation of classical literature. When nineteen, he produced a tragedy, Banise, which met with some success. After two years of studying literature and philosophy, he returned to his hometown, where he was attached to the household of Count Schönborn. In 1749, he accompanied his pupil, the young Schönborn, to Paris. There,  appointed him as his secretary. Jean-Jacques Rousseau wrote in his Confessions that Grimm played a cembalo and acted also as reader to the eldest son of Frederick III, Duke of Saxe-Gotha-Altenburg, the young hereditary prince of Saxe-Gotha.

His acquaintance with Rousseau  soon ripened into warm friendship, through a mutual sympathy in regard to music and theater, and led to a close association with the Encyclopaedists Diderot, Baron d'Holbach, d'Alembert, Marmontel, Morellet and Helvétius, who were meeting at the salon of Marie-Charlotte Hippolyte de Campet de Saujon. He rapidly obtained a thorough knowledge of the French language and acquired so perfectly the tone and sentiments of the society in which he moved that all marks of his foreign origin and training seemed effaced. In 1750, he started to write for the Mercure de France on German literature and the ideas of Gottsched. In 1752, at the beginning of the Querelle des Bouffons, he wrote Lettre de M. Grimm sur Omphale. Grimm complained that the text of the libretto had no connection with the music. Grimm and Rousseau became the enemy of Élie Catherine Fréron. In 1753, he wrote a witty pamphlet entitled Le petit prophète de Boehmischbroda, "a parable about a Bohemian boy being sent to Paris to see the lamentable state into which the French opera has descended". This defence of Italian opera established his literary reputation. It is possible that the origin of the pamphlet is partly to be accounted for by his vehement passion for Marie Fel, the prima donna of the Paris Opéra, who was one of the few French singers capable of performing Italian arias. When she refused him (and stayed in relation with Louis de Cahusac), Grimm fell into lethargy. Rousseau and abbé Raynal took care of him.

In 1753, following the example of the abbé Raynal, and with the latter's encouragement, Grimm began a literary newsletter with various German sovereigns.

Eventually, Grimm counted among his 16 (or 25) subscribers: Princess Luise Dorothea of Saxe-Meiningen, Princess Caroline Louise of Hesse-Darmstadt, Louisa Ulrika of Prussia, Henry of Prussia, Catherine II of Russia, Leopold II, Holy Roman Emperor, Gustav III of Sweden, and many princes of the smaller German states, as Charles Frederick, Grand Duke of Baden, Karl August, Grand Duke of Saxe-Weimar-Eisenach, Charles Alexander, Margrave of Brandenburg-Ansbach, William Henry, Prince of Nassau-Saarbrücken, and Frederick Michael, Count Palatine of Zweibrücken. Between 1763 and 1766, Grimm attempted to recruit Frederick the Great as a subscriber. Mme Geoffrin, whose Paris salon Grimm frequented, enrolled Stanislas Poniatowski as a subscriber, writing him: "Here is your first number, together with Grimm's accompanying letter. Your Majesty will see that it is important that no copies be made. The German courts are very loyal to Grimm in this particular. I may even say to Your Majesty that negligence on this point could have serious consequences for me, the matter having passed through my hands."

The correspondence of Grimm was strictly confidential and was not divulged during his lifetime. It embraces nearly the whole period from 1750 to 1790, but the later volumes, 1773 to 1790, were chiefly the work of his secretary, the Swiss , with whom he made acquaintance in the salon of Suzanne Curchod, the wife of Jacques Necker. At first he contented himself with enumerating the chief current views in literature and art and indicating very slightly the contents of the principal new books, but gradually his criticisms became more extended and trenchant, and he touched on nearly every subject — political, literary, artistic, social and religious — that interested the Parisian society of the time. His notices of contemporaries are somewhat severe, and he exhibits the foibles and selfishness of the society in which he moved; but he was unbiased in his literary judgments, and time has only served to confirm his criticisms. In style and manner of expression, he is thoroughly French. He is generally somewhat cold in his appreciation, but his literary taste is delicate and subtle, and it was the opinion of Sainte-Beuve that the quality of his thought in his best moments will compare not unfavourably even with that of Voltaire. His religious and philosophical opinions were entirely sceptical.

Content of the  

For several years, Grimm reported on the painters and paintings in the Salon de Paris, and was successfully succeeded by Diderot; he appreciated the architects Jacques-Germain Soufflot, and Claude-Nicolas Ledoux, the naturalist and mathematician Buffon, the mathematician Leonhard Euler, and the political scientist Condorcet. Grimm asked Diderot to review Voyage autour du monde ("A Voyage Round the World") by Louis Antoine de Bougainville. Grimm had paid attention to the case Jean Calas, the problems between Rousseau and David Hume, the Montgolfier brothers, and Madame de Staël when she published her Letters on the works and character of J.J. Rousseau. The  became one of the influential media to spread malicious and false information on Rousseau.

Grimm did not appreciate Mondonville's Daphnis et Alcimadure, though he approved the use of the Occitan language, as being closer to Italian; according to Grimm "In Zoroastre it is day and night alternately but as the poet ... cannot count up to five he has got so muddled in his reckoning that he has been compelled to make it be day and night two or three times in each act so that it might be day at the end of the play". He wrote about Caffarelli; about Pierre Beaumarchais. Grimm didn't think much of Antoine de Léris: "The author claims that the public received his work with indulgence. If perfect oblivion may so be called, the author is right to be grateful"; The diminished  continued without Grimm until the revolutionary year 1790.

Connections 

In 1755, after the death of Count von Friesen (1727–1755), who was a nephew of Marshal Maurice de Saxe and an officer in the French army, Grimm secured a sinecure worth 2000 livres a year as secrétaire des commandements to  Marshal d'Estrées on the Westphalia campaign of 1756–57 during the Seven Years' War. In 1759, he was named envoy of the town of Frankfurt am Main to the French court, but was deprived of his office for criticizing the comte de Broglie in a dispatch intercepted by Louis XV's secret service.

J.-J. Rousseau 
In 1751, Grimm was introduced by Rousseau to Madame d'Épinay, with whom he began a 30-year liaison two years later, which led after four years to an irreconcilable rupture between him, Diderot and Rousseau.

Grimm and d'Holbach supported financially the mother of Thérèse Levasseur. Instead of Rousseau, Grimm accompanied Mme. d'Épinay to Geneva to visit doctor Théodore Tronchin. Rousseau believed Grimm had made her pregnant.

Grimm criticized Rousseau's Julie, or the New Heloise and Emile, or On Education. Rousseau was induced by his resentment to give in his Confessions a malicious portrait of Grimm's character. Grimm's betrayals of his closest friend, Diderot, finally led Diderot to bitter denunciations of him too in his Lettre apologétique de l'abbé Raynal à M. Grimm in 1781.

In 1783, Grimm lost Mme. Épinay, his most intimate friend, and the following year Diderot.

Not long after, he showed Prince Henry of Prussia, on a diplomatic trip, in Paris.

Mozart's three visits to Paris 

Leopold Mozart decided to take his two child prodigies, the seven-year-old boy, Wolfgang (born 27 January 1756), and the 12-year-old girl, Nannerl (Maria Anna, born 30 July 1751), on their "Grand Tour" in June 1763. Mozart's first visit to Paris lasted from 18 November 1763 to 10 April 1764, when the family departed for London. All the many letters of recommendation carried by Leopold proved ineffectual, except the one to Melchior Grimm, which led to an effective connection. Grimm was a German who had moved to Paris at age 25 and was an advanced amateur of music and opera, which he covered as a Paris-based journalist for the aristocracy of Europe. He was persuaded "to take the German prodigies under his wing." Grimm published a highly supportive article on the Mozart children in his Correspondance littéraire of December 1763, to facilitate Leopold's entrée into Parisian high society and musical circles.

Louis Philippe II, Duke of Orléans, the son of Grimm's employer, helped the Mozarts perform in Versailles, where they stayed for two weeks over Christmas and New Year. Hermann Abert explains that "only when they had performed at Versailles were they admitted to, and admired by, aristocratic circles." Grimm recounted with pride the impressive improvisations produced by young Mozart in private and public concerts. Leopold had four of his sonatas for keyboard and violin engraved and dedicated to King Louis XV's daughter, Madame Victoire, and the Dauphine's lady-in-waiting, by "THEOPH:W:MOZART Compositeur, et Maitre de Musique, agé de 7 ans". In 1766, Carmontelle produced a group portrait of the family performing, engraved at Grimm's instigation. In 1777, Michel-Barthélémy Ollivier painted Wolfgang playing the pianoforte in the Prince of Conti's salon at the Temple, a painting now in the Louvre Museum.

After their long stay in London (15 months) and Holland (8 months), the Mozarts closed their "Grand Tour", which lasted three years and a half, by stopping over in Paris from 10 May to 9 July 1766, for Mozart's second visit to the French capital. Again, they were helped, guided, and mentored by Grimm. The children were by then 10 and 15 and had lost some of their public appeal as young prodigies on the now somewhat blasés Parisians. Grimm wrote a very flattering letter about the Mozart children dated 15 July 1766 in his Correspondance littéraire. Commenting on Mozart's remarkable progress in all areas of music-making, Grimm predicted the future operatic success of the young composer: "He has even written several Italian arias, and I have little doubt that before he has reached the age of twelve, he will already have had an opera performed at some Italian theatre."

However, Abert warns that the reason why Grimm's Journal "nonetheless needs to be treated with caution is due to the personality of its principal contributor, for Grimm was not sufficiently well trained as a musician to do justice to the art that he was describing, nor was he the man to let slip the opportunity for a flash of wit or eloquent turn of phrase, even if it meant violating the truth in the process." Grimm's second prediction at the end of the same letter didn't turn out as prescient as the first one: "If these children live, they will not remain at Salzburg. Before long monarchs will vie for their possession." In fact, Mozart was unable to obtain employment as an opera composer from a European court and remained a free-lance opera writer all his life.

Leopold sent Mozart, then aged 22, to Paris for his third and last visit, from 23 March to 26 September 1778. But this time Mozart went only with his mother, Anna Maria Mozart, while Leopold remained in Salzburg, in order to save his employment. Grimm helped, guided, and advised Mozart and his mother again, acting as a proud manager. But Mozart mostly encountered a series of disappointments, while tragedy struck when Anna Maria fell ill with typhoid fever and died on 3 July 1778. After the death of his mother, Mozart moved in with Grimm who was living with Mme d'Épinay, at 5, rue de la Chaussée-d'Antin. For the first time in his life, Mozart was on his own.

Grimm, a man with strong opinions, nicknamed "Tyran le Blanc", and Mozart did not get along very well. Mozart found himself disappointed in Paris. The city was "indescribably dirty"; Grimm complained he was "not running around enough" to get pupils, as he found that calling on his introductions was tiring, too expensive, and unproductive: "People pay their respects, and that's it. They arrange for me to come on such and such a day; I then play for them, and they say Oh, c'est un prodige, c'est inconcevable, c'est étonnant. And, with that, adieu." He never got paid for his Concerto for flute and harp in C, K. 299, written for the Duke of Guines and his daughter, nor for his ballet Les petits riens K. 299b.

Mozart was recruited by the director of the "Concert Spirituel", Joseph Legros, to write some choruses, K. 297a, which were played without giving credit to Mozart. Then Mozart wrote a Sinfonia concertante in E flat major K. 297b, for a group of four wind players from Mannheim, which he sold to Legros without keeping a copy. Legros never had it copied for performance, and the work became considered "lost". Mozart at last enjoyed one great success at the Concert Spirituel as a composer with his Symphony No. 31 in D, K. 297 (Paris Symphony), performed on 18 June 1778 "to unanimous acclaim".
Mozart kept finding Paris "totally at odds" with his "genius, inclinations, knowledge, and sympathies". He kept expressing his deep dislike of the French, their character, their rudeness, their being "frightfully arrogant", and he was "appalled by their general immorality". Like Jean-Jacques Rousseau, Mozart found the French language inherently unmusical and "so damned impossible where music is concerned", ironizing that "the devil himself must have invented the language of these people". He felt that French music was worthless: "They understand nothing about music", echoing what Leopold had declared during their first visit to Paris: "The whole of French music is not worth a sou". He judged their singers inept. "I'm surrounded by nothing but beasts and animals. But how can it be otherwise, for they're just the same in all their actions, emotions, and passions."

Suspicious by nature, Mozart ended up distrusting Grimm, while "Grimm himself was bound to find Mozart increasingly baffling as a person — with his curious mixture of self-confidence and dreaminess". Mozart found himself obliged to borrow "as much as fifteen louis d'or" from Grimm. Voltaire's death on 30 May 1778 made clear "the full extent of the yawning void between them". Grimm warned Leopold that the need for continual and intense networking in Paris was too demanding for Wolfgang, "for it is a very tiring thing to run to the four corners of Paris and exhaust oneself in explanations. And then this profession will not please him, because it will keep him from writing, which is what he likes above all things." Their dealings "ended on a note of the deepest disharmony." Leopold agreed that Mozart should leave Paris: "You don't like Paris, and on the whole I don't blame you ... My next letter will tell you that you are to leave Paris." Grimm organized for Mozart's trip to Strasbourg, promising a diligence to cover the trip in five days, but forced Mozart to travel by stagecoach, a journey that took twelve days. Mozart "himself left the city on 26 September, as ill-tempered and disgruntled as when he had arrived there." Mozart broke the journey in Nancy on 3 October, finally arriving in Strasbourg on 14 October 1778.

In the course of his three visits, Mozart spent a total of 13 months in Paris, all of them under the guidance and assistance of Grimm.

Catherine II of Russia 

Grimm's introduction to Catherine II of Russia took place at Saint Petersburg in 1773, when he was in the suite of Wilhelmina of Hesse-Darmstadt on the occasion of her marriage to the Tsarevitch Paul. A few weeks later Diderot arrived. On 1 November they both became members of the Russian Academy of Sciences. Because of his atheism, Diderot had little success in the imperial capital, and when he criticized Catharine's style of governing, Grimm moved away from him. According to Jonathan Israel, Grimm was a representative of the Enlightened Absolutism. Grimm introduced Ferdinando Galiani and Cesare Beccaria, and promoted Jean Huber and Johann Friedrich Reiffenstein in the Russian Empire. He became minister of Saxe-Gotha at the French court in 1776. In 1777, he again visited Saint Petersburg, where he remained for nearly a year.

Grimm loved to play chess and cards with the empress. According to Simon Dixon, he influenced Catherine with his ideas on Rousseau. He acted as Paris agent for the empress in the purchase of works of art, and executed many confidential commissions for her. With his help, the libraries of Diderot (in 1766) and Voltaire (in 1778) were bought and sent to the Russian capital. In 1779, he introduced Giacomo Quarenghi as an architect and Clodion as a sculptor, when Étienne Maurice Falconet came back to Paris. In 1787, Catherine asked Grimm to burn her letters to him, "or else put them in safekeeping, so that no one can unearth them for a century."

Chevalier de Saint-Georges 

Like Christoph Willibald Gluck and Ranieri de' Calzabigi, Grimm was occupied with operatic reform. Grimm loved theatre, criticized the Comédie-Française and praised the private theatre of Madame de Montesson, the wife of his employer.

A "consortium of capitalists", to quote the critic Baron Grimm, proposed Chevalier de Saint-Georges as the next director of the opera. He helped Saint-Georges, living in the adjacent mansion with Madame de Montesson. Mozart spent over two months next to Saint-Georges. The two mansions had a communal garden, a chapel and a theater.

Retirement 

From Erinnerungen einer Urgrossmutter, it becomes clear that, in 1792, he left Rue du Mont-Blanc (in 1792, during the French Revolution, rue de la Chaussée d'Antin was renamed rue du Mont-Blanc, after the department of that name. It regained its original name in 1815), and settled in Gotha, living in the ducal palace Friedenstein Palace. His poverty was relieved by Catherine, who shortly before her death appointed him minister of Russia at Hamburg. Although not very thrilled, he travelled with Émilie de Belsunce, Mme. d'Épinay's granddaughter, later Comtesse de Bueil. When he suddenly became blind on 17 January 1797, he gave up his new post. (Grimm had problems with his eyesight since 1762.) He and the young Émilie stayed a few weeks in Altona. They travelled to Braunschweig, where they stayed from the summer of 1797 until June 1800, and where Émilie was tutored by Willem Bilderdijk. Grimm was then invited again by Ernest II, Duke of Saxe-Gotha-Altenburg. He died at Gotha on 19 December 1807.

The main-belt asteroid 6912 Grimm was named after him.

Works 

The standard edition was that of Maurice Tourneux (16 vols., 1877–1882).

Grimm's , and Catherine's correspondence with Grimm (1774–1796) were published by Yakov Grot in 1880, in the collection of the Russian Imperial Historical Society. She treats him very familiarly and calls him Heraclite, Georges Dandin, etc. At the time of the Revolution, she begged him to destroy her letters, but he refused, and after his death, they were returned to Saint Petersburg. Grimm's side of the correspondence, however, is only partially preserved. He signs himself "Pleureur". Some of Grimm's letters, besides the official correspondence, are included in the edition of Tourneux; others are contained in the Erinnerungen einer Urgrossmutter of Katharina von Bechtolsheim, edited (Berlin, 1902) by Count C. Oberndorff.

Notes

References

Sources 
 
 
 
 This turn cites:
Mme d'Épinay, Mémoires
Rousseau, Confessions
E. Scherer, Melchior Grimm (1887)
Charles Augustin Sainte-Beuve, Causeries du lundi, vol. vii
K. A. Georges, Friedrich Melchior Grimm (Hanover and Leipzig, 1904).

External links 

1723 births
1807 deaths
Writers from Regensburg
German essayists
Honorary members of the Saint Petersburg Academy of Sciences
Barons of the Holy Roman Empire
German writers in French
18th-century German writers
18th-century German male writers
19th-century German writers
19th-century German male writers
Contributors to the Encyclopédie (1751–1772)
Denis Diderot
Jean-Jacques Rousseau
German male essayists